Reiss Beckford (born 17 February 1992) is a Jamaican gymnast. Prior to 2015, Beckford, from Enfield, London, competed for England and Great Britain.

In October 2010 he was part of the team which won the silver medal for England in the gymnastics in the men's artistic all-around team event at the 2010 Commonwealth Games. He also won the silver medal in the men's individual all-around event and a silver medal in the men's floor event at the same games.

Born in England with a Jamaican father, Beckford announced his decision to switch allegiance to Jamaica, a move considered likely to increase his chances of qualification for the Olympic Games in Rio in 2016.

Beckford competed at the 2015 World Gymnastics Championships in Glasgow. He and his two teammates were the first Jamaican men to do this. He did not qualify to any finals but placed high enough to qualify a Jamaican man to the Rio Test Event in April 2016 to try to qualify to the Olympic Games. However Beckford was unable to take this place at the qualifying event himself because the rules state a gymnast must not have competed for another country in the past three years. Beckford last represented Great Britain in 2014. This meant he missed out on the Rio Olympic Games but could still be the first Jamaican male gymnast to compete at an Olympics if he qualifies to Tokyo 2020.

References

External links
 
 Reiss Beckford at British Gymnastics

1992 births
Living people
British male artistic gymnasts
Commonwealth Games medallists in gymnastics
Commonwealth Games silver medallists for England
Gymnasts at the 2010 Commonwealth Games
Sportspeople from London
People from Enfield, London
Gymnasts at the 2019 Pan American Games
Pan American Games competitors for Jamaica
Medallists at the 2010 Commonwealth Games